Jack Hawkes may refer to:
Jack Hawkes (botanist) (1915–2007), British botanist
Jack Hawkes (tennis) (1899–1990), Australian tennis player

See also
John Hawkes (disambiguation)
John Hawks (disambiguation)